Ben Folds Five was an American alternative rock trio formed in 1993 in Chapel Hill, North Carolina. The group comprises Ben Folds (lead vocals, piano), Robert Sledge (bass guitar, backing vocals) and Darren Jessee (drums, backing vocals). The group achieved success in the alternative, indie and pop music scenes. Their single "Brick" from the second album, Whatever and Ever Amen (1997), gained airplay on many mainstream radio stations. 

During their first seven years, the band released three studio records, a compilation of B-sides and outtakes, and eight singles. They also contributed to a number of soundtracks and compilations. Ben Folds Five disbanded in October 2000. They reunited in 2011, and released their fourth album, The Sound of the Life of the Mind, in 2012.

History

1993–2000
Ben Folds Five was formed in 1993 in Chapel Hill by Ben Folds. They were a trio in spite of their name, and the primary motivation behind the name, apart from the band's well-known use of humor, was simple preference, according to Ben: "I think it sounds better than Ben Folds Three." Folds once described their music as "punk rock for sissies," a reaction to the angst prevalent in '90s rock.

Their first radio single was "Underground" from their self-titled debut album, released in 1995 on Caroline Records. The band's biggest success was the single "Brick" from their second album, Whatever and Ever Amen, released in 1997. It was followed by the more somber and jazz-based 1999 album, The Unauthorized Biography of Reinhold Messner. The group contributed an outtake from the Reinhold Messner sessions, titled "Leather Jacket", to the 1999 benefit album, No Boundaries: A Benefit for the Kosovar Refugees.

The band's final released recording was a cover of Steely Dan's "Barrytown" for the Me, Myself & Irene soundtrack. The band had begun work on a fourth studio album, but following the worldwide tour in support of The Unauthorized Biography of Reinhold Messner, the band "amicably" broke up in October 2000.  Tracks from the sessions later emerged in solo projects.

After the break-up (2001–2011)
Folds went on to pursue a successful solo career, releasing Rockin' the Suburbs in 2001, Songs for Silverman in 2005, Way to Normal in 2008, and Lonely Avenue in collaboration with novelist Nick Hornby in 2010. He produced and arranged actor William Shatner's second album Has Been, as well as co-wrote the majority of the songs with Shatner. Folds also contributed songs to the soundtracks for the animated movies Hoodwinked! and Over the Hedge, as well as forming the one-off side project The Bens with Ben Lee and Ben Kweller in 2003.

Jessee formed the indie band Hotel Lights in 2004, with his songs featured in television and film. Jessee released three studio albums for Bar/None Records in this time – including Hotel Lights in 2006, Firecracker People in 2008, and Girl Graffiti in 2011.

Sledge played with International Orange until the group disbanded in 2005. He later became the bass player in the three-piece Chapel Hill band Surrender Human, with Matt McMichaels from the Mayflies USA.

Reunions (2008, 2011–2013)
Ben Folds Five made a one-off concert appearance in September 2008 at the UNC Memorial Hall in Chapel Hill as part of the MySpace "Front to Back" series, in which artists play an entire album live. The band played its then-final album, The Unauthorized Biography of Reinhold Messner, and were briefly joined on stage by Ben's father, Dean Folds, who read a transcript of his voice mail message that is used in the album song "Your Most Valuable Possession", encoring with some of the songs from their first two albums.

In 2011, Ben Folds Five reunited to record three tracks for Ben Folds' The Best Imitation of Myself: A Retrospective. They made their first live appearance for four years as one of the headliners of the 2012 Mountain Jam festival. They made further appearances at that year's 2012 Bonnaroo and Summerfest festivals.

The band's fourth studio album, The Sound of the Life of the Mind was released in September 2012, supported by the single Do It Anyway, with a video featuring Anna Kendrick, Rob Corddry, Chris Hardwick and the cast of Fraggle Rock. and a tour of the US, the UK, Australia and Ireland. 

In June 2013, the trio released their first live album, titled Live. During that year Ben Folds Five toured with the Barenaked Ladies and Guster, before entering a hiatus that ultimately became permanent. Folds resumed his solo career, releasing the yMusic collaboration So There in 2015 and continuing to tour extensively. Jesse, meanwhile, released a new album with Hotel Lights in 2016, entitled Get Your Hand in My Hand, before releasing two solo albums: 2018's The Jane, Room 217 and 2020's Remover.

Discography

Studio albums

Live albums

Compilation albums

Singles

DVDsBen Folds Five – The Complete Sessions at West 54th (1999) – Epic Music Video

Other appearances
 Mr. Wrong soundtrack (1996) – Contributed "Song for the Dumped"
 The Truth About Cats & Dogs soundtrack (1996) – Contributed "Bad Idea"
 KCRW Rare On Air, Volume 3 (1997) – Contributed "Alice Childress"
 Lounge-A-Palooza (1997) – Contributed cover of "She Don't Use Jelly" by The Flaming Lips
 MegaHits Dance Party, Volume 2 (1998) – Contributed "Brick (3AM Dance Remix)"
 Triple J Hottest 100, Volume 5 (1998) – Contributed "One Angry Dwarf & 200 Solemn Faces"
 Sabrina, the Teenage Witch – The Album soundtrack (1998) – Contributed "Kate"
 Godzilla soundtrack (1998) – Contributed "Air"
 Burt Bacharach: One Amazing Night (1998) – Contributed "Raindrops Keep Fallin' On My Head"
 Teleconned, Volume 1: We Want The Airwaves (1998) – Contributed "Theme From Dr. Pyser"
 No Boundaries: A Benefit for the Kosovar Refugees benefit album (1999) – Contributed "Leather Jacket"
 Me, Myself & Irene soundtrack (2000) – Contributed a cover of "Barrytown" by Steely Dan from their third studio album Pretzel Logic Songs for Summer benefit album (2000) – Contributed "Where's Summer B.?"
 Non Stop '90s Rock (2001) – Contributed "Brick"
 Songbook'' (2002) – Contributed "Smoke"

References

External links
 

Ben Folds
Musical groups from North Carolina
Alternative rock groups from North Carolina
American power pop groups
Musical groups from Chapel Hill-Carrboro, North Carolina
Musical groups established in 1993
Musical groups disestablished in 2000
Musical groups reestablished in 2008
Musical groups reestablished in 2011
Musical groups disestablished in 2013
1993 establishments in North Carolina
550 Music artists
Geek rock groups
American musical trios